Ingst is a hamlet in the parish of Olveston in South Gloucestershire, England. It consists of nine households, most of which are farms with cattle.

The M48 motorway passes by the hamlet.

External links 

 Olveston Parish website

Villages in South Gloucestershire District